Ashcroft is a historic home located at Geneva in Ontario County, New York. It is a -story brick home with a high pitched slate roof with projecting eaves.  It is a large Gothic Revival style country house set deep in the midst of once carefully landscaped grounds.  The house and property were designed by Calvert Vaux in 1862.

It was listed on the National Register of Historic Places in 1975.

References

External links

Houses on the National Register of Historic Places in New York (state)
Gothic Revival architecture in New York (state)
Houses completed in 1862
Houses in Ontario County, New York
1862 establishments in New York (state)
Geneva, New York
National Register of Historic Places in Ontario County, New York